California's 80th State Assembly district is one of 80 California State Assembly districts. It is currently vacant after Democrat Lorena Gonzalez of San Diego resigned on January 5, 2022, to become leader of the California Labor Federation.

District profile 
The district encompasses the southern parts of urban San Diego County. It runs up against the Mexican border and takes in the Latino core of the metropolitan area.

San Diego County – 15.0%
 Chula Vista – 63.6%
 National City – 72.9%
 San Diego – 19.9%

Election results from statewide races

List of Assembly Members

Election results 1992 - present

2020

2018

2016

2014

2013 (special)

2012

2010

2008

2006

2004

2002

2000

1998

1996

1994

1992

See also 
 California State Assembly
 California State Assembly districts
 Districts in California

References

External links 
 District map from the California Citizens Redistricting Commission

80
Government of San Diego County, California
Government of San Diego
Chula Vista, California
National City, California
South Bay (San Diego County)